Sister of the Groom is a 2020 American comedy film, written and directed by Amy Miller Gross. It stars Alicia Silverstone, Tom Everett Scott, Jake Hoffman, Mathilde Ollivier, Charlie Bewley, Noah Silver, Abigail Marlowe, Mark Blum, Julie Engelbrecht and Ronald Guttman.

Audrey's brother is about to marry a French woman on Audrey's 40th birthday. She freaks out, trying to sabotage the wedding.

It was released on December 18, 2020 by Saban Films.

Plot
Audrey (Alicia Silverstone) rides to the Hamptons with her husband Ethan for her brother Liam's wedding with Clemence, a young French woman (Mathilde Ollivier), rescheduled to the same weekend she turns 40.

Minutes before they arrive, Ethan spills Audrey's coffee over her, and then she is not given the chance to change for the casual chic opening shabat dinner. So she is introduced to the French family at a Shabbat dinner, where she is upset to discover Liam is going to do massive changes to the house using an architect other than herself, her ex-boyfriend Isaac.

The next day, they go water-skiing. When Audrey is towelling off, Clemence frankly asks her if she's pregnant, as a hernia is causing her abdomen to protrude. Upset, Audrey drives the speed boat too fast when it's Clemence's turn.

Shortly after, Liam hurts his nose playing basketball. While Audrey is helping him, his fiancée storms off with him in a huff. The next part of the wedding celebration requires a white dress. As Audrey's got spoiled, she'd about to go get a replacement when she gets sidetracked a few times. One of these is, she overhears that the bride recently had an abortion. Telling Liam, he comes close to calling it off.
 
When the dust clears, the wedding is still on, but Audrey is no longer welcome. Admidst a huge screaming match between Audrey and the bride, she's told her ex has been invited to the wedding.

Audrey gets the replacement white dress in town. She is at the wedding, but no longer part of the wedding party. At the reception, Isaac makes a pass at her right after Ethan storms off in a jealous huff, probably due to his micro-dosing. She and Isaac spend some time together, and he tries to fool around with her, but she stops him.

As a way of trying to connect with the bride, Audrey sprinkles ecstasy on her cake. They connect, but soon after she gets violently ill. In the ambulance, she confesses she sprinkled molly on her cake. Audrey comes to realize she can't stand in the way of true love.

Audrey leaves the next morning early, before the Sunday brunch. She leaves an apology note to the couple, accompanying a slide show of them skinny-dipping together as husband and wife. Getting into her car, she discovers Ethan has slept off the microdose. They make up, heading home.

Cast
 Alicia Silverstone as Audrey
 Tom Everett Scott as Ethan
 Jake Hoffman as Liam
 Mathilde Ollivier as Clemence
 Charlie Bewley as Isaac
 Noah Silver as Orson
 Abigail Marlowe as Suzette
 Mark Blum as Nat
 Julie Engelbrecht as Bernetta
 Ronald Guttman as Philibert
 Wai Ching Ho as Darling Aquino

Production
In November 2018, it was announced Alicia Silverstone, Tom Everett Scott, Jake Hoffman, Mathilde Ollivier, Charlie Bewley, Noah Silver, Abigail Marlowe, Mark Blum, Julie Engelbrecht and Ronald Guttman had joined the cast of the film, with Amy Miller Gross directing from a screenplay she wrote, with Silverstone serving as an executive producer. The film was retitled from The Pleasure of Your Presence to Sister of the Groom for the European Film Market.

Release
In May 2020, Saban Films acquired distribution rights to the film. It was scheduled to be released on December 18, 2020.

Reception
The movie presently holds a 47% Rottentomatoes score  and no score yet for Metacritic.

References

External links
 
 

2020 films
2020 comedy films
American comedy films
Saban Films films
2020s English-language films
2020s American films